The 1920 Edinburgh North by-election was held on 9 April 1920.  The by-election was held due to the resignation of the incumbent Coalition Conservative MP, James Avon Clyde after he was appointed to the bench as Lord Justice General and Lord President of the Court of Session.  It was won by the Coalition Conservative candidate Patrick Ford

References

1920 in Scotland
1920s elections in Scotland
1920 elections in the United Kingdom
North, 1920
1920s in Edinburgh